Oloe Krohn "Olaf" Pooley (13 March 1914 – 14 July 2015) was an English actor, screenwriter and painter. As an actor, he appeared as Professor Stahlman in the seven-part Doctor Who serial Inferno (1970).

Early life
Pooley was born to an English father and Danish mother in Parkstone, Dorset. He studied painting at Chelsea College of Arts and at the Académie Colarossi in Paris under the tutelage of Marcel Gromaire, before training at the Architectural Association School of Architecture to enable a more financially secure career option. His paternal uncle Sir Ernest Pooley, the future Chairman of the Arts Council of Great Britain, secured him a job as a set designer at Pinewood Studios. During World War II, Pooley registered as a conscientious objector and volunteered as a fireman; he was subsequently discharged on medical grounds and began his acting career on stage.

Career
He wrote and appeared in the film The Corpse (released in the United States as Crucible of Horror), starring Michael Gough, and wrote, directed and appeared in The Johnstown Monster. He also wrote the screenplay for a film version of Bernard Taylor's novel The Godsend (1980). Beaumont directed the film. Pooley's other writing credits include the television film Falcon's Gold (1982) and being an uncredited writer on the sci-fi horror film Lifeforce (1985).

Pooley's TV guest appearances from the 1950s onwards include Dixon of Dock Green, Paul Temple, Jason King, MacGyver and Star Trek: Voyager. He played Professor Stahlman and his parallel Earth counterpart Director Stahlmann in the Doctor Who serial Inferno (1970). He also played Lars Torvik in the first episode of The Sandbaggers ("First Principles", 1978). His other appearances include the BBC Radio play Ambrose in Paris (1958) and Sebastian in a BBC Television Sunday Night Theatre production of Shakespeare's  The Tempest (1956). Pooley had a major career in West End theatre appearing in such notable productions as Noël Coward's Peace in Our Time and revivals of The Tempest and Othello. He was also a member of the BBC Radio repertory company.

Personal life
In 1946, Pooley married actress Irlin Hall and together they had a daughter, the actress Kirstie Pooley (born 1954) and a son, comedian Seyton Pooley and later divorced. In 1982, he married director Gabrielle Beaumont, although they later separated. Pooley moved to the United States in 1986 and lived in Southern California, with an art studio in Santa Monica where he devoted his time to painting. He turned 100 on 13 March 2014.

Death
He died from congestive heart failure on 14 July 2015, aged 101, at his home in Santa Monica, California. Pooley was survived by his two children, Seyton and Kirstie, and four grandchildren.

Filmography 
n.b. for credit listings reference

Film

Television

See also
 List of centenarians (actors, filmmakers and entertainers)

References

External links
 
 
 Olaf Pooley on the New York Times website
 Olaf Pooley at TV.com
 Olaf Pooley at Theatricalia

1914 births
2015 deaths
20th-century English painters
21st-century English painters
Académie Colarossi alumni
Alumni of Chelsea College of Arts
Alumni of the Architectural Association School of Architecture
British conscientious objectors
British expatriate male actors in the United States
English male painters
English people of Danish descent
English film directors
English male film actors
English male radio actors
English male stage actors
English male television actors
People from Parkstone
English centenarians
Men centenarians
20th-century English male actors
21st-century English male actors
Male actors from Dorset
20th-century English male artists
21st-century English male artists